Ivan Marinković (born 31 October 1987) is a Serbian football midfielder.

References

External links
 

1987 births
Living people
Sportspeople from Kruševac
Association football midfielders
Serbian footballers
Serbian SuperLiga players
FK Napredak Kruševac players
FK Radnik Surdulica players
FK Sloga Kraljevo players
Serbian expatriate footballers
FK Milano Kumanovo players
Expatriate footballers in North Macedonia
FK Leotar players
Expatriate footballers in Bosnia and Herzegovina
Rovigo Calcio players
Expatriate footballers in Italy